Betty Boyd (born September 16, 1943) is an American state legislator. She represented the 21st district in the Colorado State Senate. During her term, she chaired the Health and Human Services Committee and served for a time as the senate president pro tempore.

Biography

Early life and education
Betty earned a baccalaureate degree in Sociology from Upsala College in New Jersey.

Legislative career

Marriage and children
Betty and Douglas Boyd have two adult children, Jim and Kirsten.

References

External links

 campaign website

Living people
1943 births
Upsala College alumni
Democratic Party Colorado state senators
Democratic Party members of the Colorado House of Representatives
People from Manchester, Connecticut
Women state legislators in Colorado
21st-century American politicians
21st-century American women politicians